Emerson Moisés Costa (born 12 April 1972), known simply as Emerson, is a Brazilian retired professional footballer who played as a defensive midfielder.

As well as in his country, he played professionally in Portugal, England, Spain and Scotland. He also received Portuguese citizenship, after he married his Portuguese wife.

Club career
Born in Rio de Janeiro, Emerson started playing with Flamengo, but he soon moved to Coritiba in search of first-team football. In 1991 he began his extensive overseas spell, first with C.F. Os Belenenses in Portugal.

After several impressive displays, Emerson secured a move to FC Porto. Under the management of former England coach Bobby Robson, he won successive Primeira Liga titles, appeared in the UEFA Champions League and won the 1996 Portuguese Player of the Year award.

By now, Emerson's performances had attracted interest from major European clubs, and eventually he signed with Premier League side Middlesbrough, completing a £4 million move. It is alleged that the deal was done without manager Bryan Robson's knowledge, the manager only finding out after it was unwittingly mentioned by chief scout Ray Trainn; Emerson's cousin Fábio was also acquired, but played just one game in his 14-month spell.

However, things turned sour quickly with Emerson's former manager Bobby Robson, now at FC Barcelona, expressing his interest in bringing the player to the Camp Nou – this unsettled the midfielder, who by this time had already endured relegation to Division One in addition to difficulties in adjusting to life on Teesside. He travelled to Brazil for a break at the end of 1997, and once there threatened that he would not return to the club.

Eventually the dispute was resolved with a move to CD Tenerife in January 1998, for around £4.25 million. Surprisingly, Middlesbrough chief executive Keith Lamb later stated that he had tried to re-sign Emerson after Tenerife were relegated, and the latter remained in the Canary Islands until 2000 when he moved to Deportivo de La Coruña, after the Galicians' 2000 conquest of the La Liga title. He often partnered compatriot Mauro Silva in his first year, but played sparingly in the following.

After further one-year stints with Atlético Madrid and Rangers, where he became the first ever Brazilian to play for the Scottish, scoring once against Panathinaikos in the 2003–04 Champions League,

Emerson moved to Greece, joining Skoda Xanthi in the summer of 2005. After having stayed there only six months, he was transferred to AEK Athens, in January 2006. On 21 November 2006, he played the whole match in the 1–0 victory against the eventuall champions, Milan for the UEFA Champions League.

On 23 May 2007, Emerson was released by AEK and signed for 2006–07 Cypriot First Division champions APOEL. However, in January of the following year, he returned to Brazil and ended his career playing for lowly Madureira Esporte Clube, at the Rio de Janeiro State League.

In pop culture
Emerson is widely known in Hungary, due an infamous interview with his former teammate Péter Lipcsei, who referred to Emerson as "black Emerson".

Honours

Porto
Primeira Liga: 1994–95, 1995–96

References

External links
 
 CBF data 
 
 
 

1972 births
Living people
Footballers from Rio de Janeiro (city)
Brazilian footballers
Association football midfielders
FA Cup Final players
Campeonato Brasileiro Série A players
Primeira Liga players
Liga Portugal 2 players
Premier League players
English Football League players
La Liga players
Segunda División players
Scottish Premier League players
Super League Greece players
Cypriot First Division players
CR Flamengo footballers
Coritiba Foot Ball Club players
CR Vasco da Gama players
Madureira Esporte Clube players
C.F. Os Belenenses players
FC Porto players
Middlesbrough F.C. players
CD Tenerife players
Deportivo de La Coruña players
Atlético Madrid footballers
Rangers F.C. players
Xanthi F.C. players
AEK Athens F.C. players
APOEL FC players
Brazilian expatriate footballers
Brazilian expatriate sportspeople in Portugal
Expatriate footballers in Portugal
Brazilian expatriate sportspeople in England
Expatriate footballers in England
Brazilian expatriate sportspeople in Spain
Expatriate footballers in Spain
Brazilian expatriate sportspeople in Scotland
Expatriate footballers in Scotland
Brazilian expatriate sportspeople in Greece
Expatriate footballers in Greece
Brazilian expatriate sportspeople in Cyprus
Expatriate footballers in Cyprus